Gustavo López may refer to:
Gustavo Lopez (born 1985), American MMA fighter
Gustavo Adrián López (born 1973), Argentine footballer
Gustavo Fabián López (born 1983), Argentine footballer
Gustavo Vargas López (born 1955), Mexican footballer